is a Japanese rower. He competed at the 1968 Summer Olympics and the 1976 Summer Olympics.

References

1948 births
Living people
Japanese male rowers
Olympic rowers of Japan
Rowers at the 1968 Summer Olympics
Rowers at the 1976 Summer Olympics
Sportspeople from Toyama Prefecture